The Stoker is a 1932 American film directed by Chester M. Franklin.

Plot summary 
A man whose wife has deserted him winds up saving a beautiful girl from the clutches of a murderous bandit on a Nicaraguan coffee plantation.

Cast 
Monte Blue as Dick Martin
Dorothy Burgess as Margarita Valdez
Noah Beery as Santini
Natalie Moorhead as Vera Martin
Richard Tucker as Alan Ballard
Clarence Geldart as Senor Valdez
Charles Stevens as Ernesto
Harry J. Vejar as Jailer
Chris-Pin Martin as Chief of Police

References

External links 

1932 films
1932 drama films
American drama films
American black-and-white films
Films with screenplays by F. Hugh Herbert
1930s English-language films
Films directed by Chester Franklin
1930s American films